Brækhus is a Norwegian surname. Notable people with the surname include:

Cecilia Brækhus (born 1981), Norwegian boxer
Sjur Brækhus (1918–2009), Norwegian legal judge and scholar
Stein Inge Brækhus (born 1967), Norwegian jazz musician

Norwegian-language surnames